Sutton Valence School (SVS) is an independent school near Maidstone in southeast England. It has 560 pupils. It is a co-educational day and boarding school. There are three senior boarding houses: Westminster, St Margaret's and Sutton.

History
The school was founded in 1576 as the Free Grammar School of William Lambe in Sutton Valence, by William Lambe, Master of the Worshipful Company of Clothworkers and a member of the Chapel Royal of Henry VIII. It remained under the control of the Worshipful Company of Clothworkers until 1910 when it was taken under the control of United Westminster Schools, a charitable trust which also incorporates Emanuel School and Westminster City School in London and more recently combined with Grey Coat Hospital and Queen Anne's School as The United Westminster and Grey Coat Foundation.

In 1983, the school became co-educational and in 1995 it incorporated Underhill Preparatory School. It is now a co-educational day and boarding school catering for pupils from two to eighteen years of age. It has local and overseas pupils.

The school has gone through renovation and expansion, building a new maths block, theatre, indoor swimming pool, second astro pitch and an all-weather track and field facility. The sports hall is dedicated to Sydney Wooderson, a former pupil and Olympic athlete who held the world record for the mile.

Boarding houses
On 21 July 1911, the Archbishop of Canterbury, Randall Davidson, opened the new buildings, comprising the Main School and the St Margaret's, or Headmaster's Wing. The Westminster Wing was still under construction. The site had previously been leased to the school by the Filmer family as a playing field before the acquisition of the 'Upper' and subsequently used as the village recreation ground. It has been purchased outright by a Master of the Clothworkers’, W. E. Horne, and presented to the new governing body.

Upper School houses derive their names from the City of Westminster Schools Association. Leslie Bridges, the first housemaster of Westminster lent his name to the nickname of "Ponts". St Margaret's is named after the Westminster Parish Church, dedicated to St Margaret of Antioch.

CCF
The CCF and the Duke of Edinburgh's Award Scheme (DofE) are for pupils in Year 9 and above. CCF courses are supplemented by termly field days offering overnight camps, exercises and adventure training. DofE members undertake service in the community and expeditions. Pupils in Year 10 and Year 11 can opt out of this provision and study for a creative subject in GCSE. The CCF meets on a Wednesday afternoon. Each afternoon is started by a Contingent parade outside the School's Cornwallis Building. The CCF train on Field Days at military bases. Sutton Valence School CCF is affiliated to the Princess of Wales's Royal Regiment.

Coat of arms

School uses coat of arms of the founder William Lambe and the motto of the Worshipful Company of Clothworkers.
 Coat of arms blazoned: Sable, on a fess Or, between three pierced cinquefoil ermine, two mullets sable.
 Motto: My Trust is in God Alone

Buildings

Notable alumni

 Jon Brewer  English documentary director and producer who was formerly a manager of rock music acts and artists
 Terence Cuneo CVO, OBE, RGI, FGRA painter
 Sir Charles Groves, CBE conductor
 Paul Anderson, OBE, GB Olympic sailor
 Gordon Apps, DFC, World War I flying ace
 Ajahn Amaro (Jeremy Horner), Abbot, Amaravati buddhist monastery
 Cecil W Bacon, illustrator
 Ali Bongo, magician
 Ashley Jackson, GB Olympic hockey player Member of Bronze medal winning England men's hockey team, Commonwealth Games 2014
 Ben Brown, BBC journalist
 Joseph Friedman, inventor of the flexible drinking straw
 John Howard Churchill, Dean of Carlisle (1973–1987)
 Mark Benson, England and Kent County cricket captain and ICC Elite umpire
Sir Reginald Champion, Governor of Aden
 John Ellis, a flying ace of the Second World War
 Peter Fairley, TV science journalist
 Peter Polycarpou, actor and musician
 Robbie Joseph, Kent cricket player
 Robert Fisk, journalist
 Sydney Wooderson, Olympic athlete and world record holder
 Susannah Townsend, GB hockey player, member of Gold medal winning GB women's hockey team, Rio Olympic Games 2016
 Reginald Fulljames, aviator, cricketer, Military Cross recipient
 Jack Gannon, cricketer and British Army officer
 David Foster, cricketer
 James Friend, cinematographer

References

External links
 BBC Education league table
 Inspection Report on Sutton Valence School

Private schools in Kent
Member schools of the Headmasters' and Headmistresses' Conference
Borough of Maidstone
Charles Holden buildings
1576 establishments in England
Educational institutions established in the 1570s